Tappa Gawri is an archaeological site in the Kermanshah, in Iran, about  from the south of the Ashayer Blvd (former Sanjabi Street). Tappa Gawri is one of the four mound sites in Kermanshah city. The other mound sites are Chogha Kaboud, Chogha Golan, and Morad Hasel. The site was recorded during an initial season of archaeological research in the Kermanshah and Mahidasht valleys, in the summer of 1975, by a team directed by Louis D. Levine from the Royal Ontario Museum, with the assistance of the Iranian Centre for Archaeological Research. They found surface archaeological material date to Chalcolithic, Bronze Age, Iron Age, Parthian, and Sassanian periods.

References

1975 archaeological discoveries
Archaeological sites in Iran
National works of Iran
Prehistoric Iran
Kermanshah
Populated places established in the 5th millennium BC
Populated places disestablished in the 1st millennium BC
Former populated places in Iran